Mount Sharp, officially Aeolis Mons, is a mountain on Mars. Its ID in the United States Geological Survey's Gazetteer of Planetary Nomenclature is 15000.

On August 6, 2012, Curiosity (the Mars Science Laboratory rover) landed in "Yellowknife" Quad 51 of Aeolis Palus, next to the mountain.  NASA named the landing site Bradbury Landing on August 22, 2012. Aeolis Mons is a primary goal for scientific study.  On June 5, 2013, NASA announced that Curiosity would begin an  journey from the Glenelg area to the base of Aeolis Mons. On November 13, 2013, NASA announced that an entryway the rover would traverse on its way to Aeolis Mons was to be named "Murray Buttes", in honor of planetary scientist Bruce C. Murray (1931–2013). The trip was expected to take about a year and would include stops along the way to study the local terrain.

On September 11, 2014, NASA announced that Curiosity had reached Aeolis Mons, the rover mission's long-term prime destination. Possible recurrent slope lineae, wet brine flows, were reported on Mount Sharp near Curiosity in 2015. In June 2017, NASA reported that an ancient striated lake had existed in Gale crater that could have been favorable for microbial life.

Formation
The mountain appears to be an enormous mound of eroded sedimentary layers sitting on the central peak of Gale. The sediments may have been laid down over an interval of 2 billion years, and may have once completely filled the crater. Some of the lower sediment layers may have originally been deposited on a lake bed, while observations of possibly cross-bedded strata in the upper mound suggest aeolian processes. However, this issue is debated, and the origin of the lower layers remains unclear. If katabatic wind deposition played the predominant role in the emplacement of the sediments, as suggested by reported 3 degree radial slopes of the mound's layers, erosion would have come into play largely to place an upper limit on the mound's growth.

On December 8, 2014, a panel of NASA scientists discussed (archive 62:03) the latest observations of Curiosity about how water may have helped shape the landscape of Mars, including Aeolis Mons, and had a climate long ago that could have produced long-lasting lakes at many Martian locations.

On October 8, 2015, NASA confirmed that lakes and streams existed in Gale crater 3.3 - 3.8 billion years ago delivering sediments to build up the lower layers of Mount Sharp.

On February 1, 2019, NASA scientists reported that Curiosity had determined, for the first time, the density of Mount Sharp in Gale crater, thereby establishing a clearer understanding of how the mountain was formed.

Size comparisons

In comparison, Mount Everest rises to  altitude above sea level (asl), but is only  (base-to-peak) (btp). Africa's Mount Kilimanjaro is about  altitude above sea level to the Uhuru peak; also 4.6 km base-to-peak.
Compared to the Andes, Aeolis Mons would rank outside the hundred tallest peaks, being roughly the same height as Argentina's Cerro Pajonal; the peak is higher than any above sea level in Oceania, but base-to peak it is considerably shorter than Hawaii's Mauna Kea and its neighbors.

Name
Discovered in the 1970s, the mountain remained unnamed for several decades. When Gale crater became a candidate landing site, the mountain was given various labels e.g. in 2010 a NASA photo caption called it "Gale crater mound". In March 2012, NASA unofficially named it "Mount Sharp", after American geologist Robert P. Sharp.

Since 1919 the International Astronomical Union (IAU) has been the official body responsible for planetary nomenclature. Under its long-established rules for naming features on Mars, mountains are named after the classical albedo feature in which they are located, not after people. In May 2012 the IAU officially named the mountain Aeolis Mons after the Aeolis albedo feature. It also gave the name Aeolis Palus to the plain located on the crater floor between the northern wall of Gale and the northern foothills of the mountain. The IAU's choice of name is supported by the United States Geological Survey.

NASA and the European Space Agency continue to refer to the mountain as "Mount Sharp" in press conferences and press releases. This is similar to their use of other informal names, such as the Columbia Hills near one of the Mars Exploration Rover landing sites.

In August 2012, the magazine Sky & Telescope ran an article explaining the rationale of the two names and held an informal poll to determine which one was preferred by their readers. Over 2700 people voted, with Aeolis Mons winning by 57% to Mount Sharp's 43%.

Spacecraft exploration

On December 16, 2014, NASA reported detecting, based on measurements by the Curiosity rover, an unusual increase, then decrease, in the amounts of methane in the atmosphere of the planet Mars; as well as, detecting Martian organic chemicals in powder drilled  from a rock by the rover. Also, based on deuterium to hydrogen ratio studies, much of the water at Gale Crater on Mars was found to have been lost during ancient times, before the lakebed in the crater was formed; afterwards, large amounts of water continued to be lost.

On June 1, 2017, NASA reported that the Curiosity rover provided evidence of an ancient lake in Gale crater on Mars that could have been favorable for microbial life; the ancient lake was stratified, with shallows rich in oxidants and depths poor in oxidants; and, the ancient lake provided many different types of microbe-friendly environments at the same time. NASA further reported that the Curiosity rover will continue to explore higher and younger layers of Mount Sharp in order to determine how the lake environment in ancient times on Mars became the drier environment in more modern times.

On August 5, 2017, NASA celebrated the fifth anniversary of the Curiosity landing, and related exploratory accomplishments, on the planet Mars. (Videos: Curiosity First Five Years (02:07); Curiosity POV: Five Years Driving (05:49); Curiosity Discoveries About Gale Crater (02:54))

On April 11, 2019, NASA announced that Curiosity had drilled into, and closely studied, a "clay-bearing unit" which, according to the rover Project Manager, is a "major milestone" in Curiosity journey up Mount Sharp.

Curiosity mission 

Since September 11, 2014, Curiosity has been  exploring the slopes of Mount Sharp, where more information about the history of Mars is expected to be found.

Gallery

See also

 Aeolis quadrangle/Gale crater
 Composition of Mars
 Geology of Mars
 List of craters on Mars
 List of mountains on Mars
 List of mountains on Mars by height
 List of rocks on Mars
 List of tallest mountains in the Solar System

References

Further reading
Jürgen Blunck – Mars and its Satellites, A Detailed Commentary on the Nomenclature, 2nd edition. 1982.

External links

 Google Mars scrollable map – centered on Aeolis Mons.
 Aeolis Mons – Curiosity Rover "StreetView" (Sol 2 – 08/08/2012) – NASA/JPL – 360° Panorama
 Aeolis Mons – Curiosity Rover Mission Summary – Video (02:37)
 Aeolis Mons – HiRise (South side of mountain)
 Aeolis Mons – "Mount Sharp" Oblique (19,663px × 1,452px)
 Aeolis Mons – Gale crater – Image/THEMIS VIS 18m/px Mosaic (Zoomable) (small)
 Aeolis Mons – Gale crater – image/HRSCview 
 Aeolis Mons – HRSCview  (oblique view looking east)
 Aeolis Mons –  7,703px × 2,253px black & white panorama
 Aeolis Mons –  Color Panorama by Damien Bouic
 Images – PIA16105 PIA16104 Color view
 High-resolution overflight videos: #1; #2; #3; #4 (based on HiRISE data) of the lower slopes of Mt. Sharp by Seán Doran (see album for more)
 
 
 

Aeolis quadrangle
Mountains on Mars
Gale (crater)
Mars Science Laboratory